City Beach Senior High School was a public co-educational senior high day school, that was located in City Beach, a beachside suburb approximately  west of Perth, Western Australia. The school was operated by the WA Department of Education.

The school's service area included City Beach, Floreat, Wembley Downs, and a corridor leading to Glendalough and Wembley. The Bold Park Kindergarten was located on the campus property.

History
As of 1997 the school had 350 students.

On 9 December 2005 the school closed. 

In 2007 the City Beach Residential College opened on the former high school property.

See also

 List of defunct public schools in Perth, Western Australia

References

External links

 City Beach Senior High School (Archive)

Defunct schools in Western Australia
2005 disestablishments in Australia
Educational institutions disestablished in 2005